Klonarda Nezaj  (born 20 July 1988) is an Albanian volleyball player. She is a member of the Albanian women's volleyball national team and Albanian women's pro teams. Her role is middle blocker/hitter.
She has been playing volleyball since she was 13 years old. She has a bachelor's and master's degree in law.

After taking a season off to dedicate to her family, she returned to play for Partizani Volley and seized both Albanian Cup and Championship for season 2017–2018. Currently playing with Mirdita Volley.

Clubs & Awards

  SK Tirana Volley (2005–2009)
  Minatori Rreshen (2010–2011)
  SK Tirana Volley (2011–2013)
  Barleti Volley (2013-2015)
  SK Tirana Volley (2015–2016)
  Partizani Volley (2017-2018)
  Partizani Volley (2017-2018)
  Mirdita Volley (2018-2019)
  Partizani Volley (2019-2020)
 2008, 2009, 2013 Albanian League Championship –   Champion, with SK Tirana Volley
 2011 Albanian League Championship –   Champion, with Minatori Rreshen
 2014, 2015 Albanian League Championship –   Champion, with Barleti Volley
2018 Albanian League Championship –   Champion, with Partizani Volley
 2008, 2012, 2013 Albanian Cup Championship –   Champion, with SK Tirana Volley
 2011 Albanian Cup Championship –   Champion, with Minatori Rreshen
 2014, 2015 Albanian Cup Championship –   Champion, with Barleti Volley
2018 Albanian Cup Championship –   Champion, with Partizani Volley

References

Competitors at the 2009 Mediterranean Games
Albanian women's volleyball players
People from Tropojë
Sportspeople from Tirana
21st-century Albanian lawyers
1988 births
Living people
Middle blockers
Albanian expatriate sportspeople in the United States
Expatriate volleyball players in the United States
Mediterranean Games competitors for Albania